Helice is a genus of crabs, containing four species:
Helice formosensis Rathbun, 1931
Helice latimera Parisi, 1918
Helice tientsinensis Rathbun, 1931
Helice tridens (De Haan, 1835)

References

Grapsoidea